Cervantes is a highly fictionalized 1967 film Franco-Spanish-Italian international co-production biography of the early life of Miguel de Cervantes (1547–1616). Based on the 1937 novel A Man Called Cervantes by Bruno Frank, it was the first screen biography of the author. Directed by Vincent Sherman, and filmed in color, it stars Horst Buchholz as Cervantes; Gina Lollobrigida as a prostitute with whom he becomes involved; José Ferrer as Hassan Bey, the Turk who held Cervantes in captivity; Louis Jourdan as Cardinal Giulio Acquaviva; and Fernando Rey as King Philip II. Italian actor Tiziano Cortini  who usually used the name "Lewis Jordan"" appeared under his own name to avoid confusion with Louis Jourdan. Enrique Alarcón did the production design.

Plot

Cast
Horst Buchholz as Miguel de Cervantes
Gina Lollobrigida as Giulia
José Ferrer as Hassan Bey
Louis Jourdan as Cardinal Acquaviva
Francisco Rabal as	Rodrigo Cervantes
Antonio Casas as Favio
Soledad Miranda as	Nessa
Ángel del Pozo as 	Don Juan de Austria
Ricardo Palacios as Sancho
Maurice de Canonge 		
 Tiziano Cortini
José Nieto as Minister of Philip II of Spain
 Andrés Mejuto as Cervantes' Father

Production

Filming began in 1966, and the movie was released in several countries between 1967 and 1969.

Reception

Released in the U.S. as a B-movie, and retitled Young Rebel, the film went unnoticed at the box office and did not do well critically.

External links

1967 films
1967 adventure films
1960s historical adventure films
1960s biographical films
Spanish historical adventure films
Spanish biographical films
French historical adventure films
French biographical films
Italian historical adventure films
Italian biographical films
Films directed by Vincent Sherman
Films set in the 16th century
Films set in Spain
Films set in the Mediterranean Sea
Biographical films about writers
Cultural depictions of Miguel de Cervantes
Films shot in Almería
English-language Spanish films
English-language French films
English-language Italian films
Films set in the Ottoman Empire
1960s Italian films
1960s French films